Fernando Torres de Portugal y Mesía Venegas y Ponce de León, first count of Villadompardo was Spanish viceroy of Peru from 1584 to 20 November 1589.

Biography
In 1576 he was named the first count of Villadompardo by King Philip II.

He was named viceroy on 31 March 1584. On 30 April 1586, during his administration, Isabel Flores de Oliva, later Saint Rose of Lima, was born. The Lima people knew him as el Temblecón (The Quaking One), from the frequent nervous shaking in his hands.

The English corsair Thomas Cavendish appeared off the coast.
On 9 July 1586 a strong earthquake struck Lima and Callao, and an associated tsunami did some damage in Callao. The first books printed in Peru were produced by Antonio Ricardo, a printer from Turin settled in Lima.

Torres de Portugal founded his entailed estate (mayorazgo) in Seville on 12 October 1592.

External links
 A few details
 Earthquake and tsunami
 Foundation of the countship
 Santa Rosa de Lima

Viceroys of Peru
Year of birth missing
Year of death missing
1580s in the Viceroyalty of Peru